The  is a railway line in Kyushu, Japan, operated by the Kyushu Railway Company (JR Kyushu). It connects Yatsushiro on the Kagoshima Main Line to Hayato station, Kirishima on the Nippo Main Line. From 1909 the line was the original rail connection from Yatsushiro to Kagoshima (and via the Kitto Line, Miyazaki) until the Yatsushiro – Kagoshima coastal route via Sendai opened in 1927.

The major part of the line is in the mountainous Kirishima range. No through trains are operated on this line, rather, trains go from Yatsushiro to Hitoyoshi, from Hitoyoshi to Yoshimatsu, and from Yoshimatsu to Hayato. Until 2000, some trains operated direct from Kumamoto to Miyazaki via the Yatsushiro to Yoshimatsu section of the line.

Stations

History
The entire line was built by the government railways. The Hayato – Yoshimatsu section was opened in 1903, followed by the Yatsushiro – Hitoyoshi section in 1908. When the line names were officially designated in October 1909, the former became a part of the Kagoshima Main Line and the latter the Hitoyoshi Main Line.  In November 1910, with the Hitoyoshi – Yoshimatsu section (which included the Okoba switchback and spiral) opening, both sections were connected and the Hitoyoshi Main Line was merged to the Kagoshima Main Line.

In 1927, following the opening of the current 'west coast' Kagoshima Main Line via Sendai, the line was renamed the Hitatsu Line.

Freight services ceased the day the line (and the entire JNR system) was privatised in 1987.

Former connecting lines
Kurino station – the Yamano Line junctioned here. The first 24 km section of the Yamano Line was opened to Yamano in 1921. The 14 km Minamata (on the Kagoshima Main Line) – Kugino section opened in 1934, and the 10 km Yamano – Satsuma-Fuke section the following year. In 1937, the 8 km Kugino – Satsuma-Fuke section, including the Okawa spiral opened, connecting the two sections. Freight services ceased in 1986, and the line closed in 1988.

Flood damage 
Since 4 July 2020, no trains have operated on the 86.8 km section of the line between Yatsushiro and Yoshimatsu, due to catastrophic damage caused by the 2020 Kyushu floods, including much of the track being completely destroyed, especially in areas where the line runs directly parallel to the Kuma River.

JR Kyushu has not announced a set date for resumption of rail service on this section, apart from stating that services would be suspended for an indefinite period. JR Kyushu's president Toshihiko Aoyagi has stated that the restoration cost can not be determined until agreements have been made amongst local communities, prefectures and the national government, regarding management of the Kuma River. On 17 March 2022, the restoration cost was estimated to be about 23 billion yen.

In popular culture
The track section between Yatsushiro and Yoshimatsu was featured in Microsoft Train Simulator. A  Hisatsu Line-based layout is available for the Japanese model train simulator VRM.

References

Bibliography
 Route diagram:  pp. 12–14, Vol. 14, October 25, 2006 - JTB Publishing.

External links
 Hisatsu Line Stations

 
1067 mm gauge railways in Japan
Railways with Zig Zags